Mr. 305 Inc. is an American record label based in Miami, Florida, that was founded by rapper Pitbull. Pitbull's nickname, "305" also stands for the area code of Miami. The label specialises in reggaeton and hip hop acts.

Members
Artists

 Pitbull
 Fuego
 Angel
 Austin Mahone
 Alexis & Fido
 Angel & Khriz
 Don Miguelo
 David Rush
 Che'Nelle
 Fat Joe
 EC
 Xenia Ghali
 Montana Tucker
 Jamie Drastik
 Lenier

Producers
DJ Buddha
IAmChino

Discography

Albums
Pitbull
2009: Rebelution
2010: Armando
2011: Planet Pit
2012: Global Warming
2013: Meltdown
2015: Dale
2017: Climate Change
2019: Libertad 548

Compilation albums
2001: The Same Time 'DR-E' Drop'd 2001
2017: Pitbull Greatest Hits

Mixtapes
Pitbull
2004: The Streets Are Talking In The Tongues Of Animals
2007: International Takeover: The United Nations Down
2013: Mr. Worldwide
2015: Dale

Jamie Drastik
2011: Champagne and Cocaine
2012: September

References

American record labels
American independent record labels
Record labels established in 2009
Columbia Records
2009 establishments in Florida
Companies based in Miami
American companies established in 2009